Dennis Johnson (born February 24, 1990) is a former American football running back. He played college football for Arkansas. He was signed by the Houston Texans as an undrafted free agent in 2013. He has also been a member of the Cleveland Browns.

Professional career

Houston Texans
Johnson was signed by the Houston Texans on April 28, 2013. He was released by the Texans on August 30, 2013.

Cleveland Browns
Johnson signed with the Cleveland Browns on September 2, 2013. He was released by the Browns on September 7 and re-signed to the Browns' practice squad on September 10, 2013.

Houston Texans
Johnson was claimed by the Houston Texans off the Browns' practice squad on October 27, 2013. The Texans released Johnson on August 11, 2014.

References

External links
Houston Texans bio
Cleveland Browns bio
Arkansas Razorbacks bio

1990 births
Living people
People from Texarkana, Arkansas
Players of American football from Arkansas
American football running backs
Arkansas Razorbacks football players
Houston Texans players
Cleveland Browns players
Brooklyn Bolts players